Yeoman is a town in Jefferson Township, Carroll County, Indiana, United States. The population was 139 at the 2010 census. It is part of the Lafayette, Indiana Metropolitan Statistical Area.

History
Yeoman was platted in 1880. It was named for Col. Yeoman, a railroad employee.

Geography
Yeoman is located at  (40.668138, -86.723597).

Demographics

2010 census
As of the census of 2010, there were 139 people, 51 households, and 38 families living in the town. The racial makeup of the town was 100.0% White.

There were 51 households, of which 49.0% had children under the age of 18 living with them, 43.1% were married couples living together, 11.8% had a female householder with no husband present, 19.6% had a male householder with no wife present, and 25.5% were non-families. 21.6% of all households were made up of individuals, and 7.9% had someone living alone who was 65 years of age or older. The average household size was 2.73 and the average family size was 2.92.

The median age in the town was 27.1 years. 28.8% of residents were under the age of 18; 13.8% were between the ages of 18 and 24; 30.1% were from 25 to 44; 23% were from 45 to 64; and 4.3% were 65 years of age or older. The gender makeup of the town was 49.6% male and 50.4% female.

2000 census
As of the census of 2000, there were 96 people, 40 households, and 26 families living in the town. The racial makeup of the town was 100.00% White. Hispanic or Latino of any race were 3.12% of the population.

There were 40 households, out of which 32.5% had children under the age of 18 living with them, 45.0% were married couples living together, 15.0% had a female householder with no husband present, and 35.0% were non-families. 32.5% of all households were made up of individuals, and 10.0% had someone living alone who was 65 years of age or older. The average household size was 2.40 and the average family size was 3.04.

In the town, the population was spread out, with 27.1% under the age of 18, 9.4% from 18 to 24, 31.3% from 25 to 44, 25.0% from 45 to 64, and 7.3% who were 65 years of age or older. The median age was 31 years. For every 100 females, there were 95.9 males. For every 100 females age 18 and over, there were 84.2 males.

The median income for a household in the town was $53,214, and the median income for a family was $57,500. Males had a median income of $38,250 versus $23,333 for females. The per capita income for the town was $20,315. There were no families and 2.1% of the population living below the poverty line, including no under eighteens and none of those over 64.

Education
Yeoman has a public library, a branch of the Delphi Public Library.

References

Towns in Carroll County, Indiana
Towns in Indiana
Lafayette metropolitan area, Indiana
Populated places established in 1880
1880 establishments in Indiana